Helicobacter hepaticus is a bacterium in the Helicobacteraceae family, Campylobacterales order.

It has a spiral shape and bipolar, single, sheathed flagellum, and was first isolated from the livers of mice with active, chronic hepatitis. The bacteria also colonized the cecal and colonic mucosae of mice. It elicits persistent hepatitis in mice. It has also been associated with colorectal cancer and other diseases. Its genome has been sequenced and is 1,799,146 bases long with 1,875 coding sequences.

References

Further reading

External links

Type strain of Helicobacter hepaticus at BacDive -  the Bacterial Diversity Metadatabase

Campylobacterota
Bacteria described in 1994